The UMass Minutewomen lacrosse team is an NCAA Division I college lacrosse team representing the University of Massachusetts Amherst as part of the Atlantic 10 Conference. They play their home games at Garber Field in Amherst, Massachusetts.

Individual career records

Reference:

Individual single-season records

Seasons

Postseason Results

The Minutewomen have appeared in 11 NCAA tournaments, excluding their 2010 play-in game loss, which is not counted as a tournament game in NCAA's record book. Their official postseason record is 9-10.

References

Atlantic 10 Conference women's lacrosse
UMass Minutemen and Minutewomen lacrosse
1976 establishments in Massachusetts
Lacrosse clubs established in 1976
College women's lacrosse teams in the United States
Women's sports in Massachusetts